Dhanwati Chandela (born 1960) is an Indian politician in the Aam Aadmi Party. She represents Rajouri Garden in the Sixth Legislative Assembly of Delhi, elected to the post in 2020 after defeating Bharatiya Janata Party candidate Ramesh Khanna.

Political career
Chandela joined the Aam Aadmi Party in 2019 after serving as a 3-term Municipal Corporation of Delhi councillor. Her husband is Dyanand Chandila, a  former MLA from Rajouri Garden and Vishnu Garden Assembly seats.

Member of Legislative Assembly (2020 - present)
Since 2020, she is an elected member of the 7th Delhi Assembly.

Committee assignments of Delhi Legislative Assembly 
 Member (2022-2023), Committee on Estimates

Electoral performance

References  

1960 births
Living people
People from Delhi
Delhi MLAs 2020–2025
Aam Aadmi Party MLAs from Delhi